Jacomeno Barrett (born 3 December 1984) is a Jamaican international footballer who plays for Montego Bay United, as a goalkeeper.

Career
Barrett has played club football for Joe Public, Sporting Central Academy and Montego Bay United.

International
He made his international debut for Jamaica in February 2012 against the Cuba national football team.

References 

1984 births
Living people
Jamaican footballers
Jamaica international footballers
Expatriate footballers in Trinidad and Tobago
Joe Public F.C. players
Jamaican expatriate footballers
Sporting Central Academy players
Association football goalkeepers
Jamaican expatriate sportspeople in Trinidad and Tobago
TT Pro League players
Montego Bay United F.C. players
National Premier League players